Télécom & Management SudParis (ex - INT: Institut National des Télécommunications ) groups two French Grande École located in Évry, a town south of Paris, France.  It was formerly a research centre for France Télécom, and later turned into the leading institute for higher studies and research in telecommunications technology and the management of information and communications technology.

Former member of the UniverSud Paris.

The institute is composed of:
 Télécom SudParis, an Engineering school focused on the telecommunication industry
 Institut Mines-Télécom Business School, a Business School specializing in the IT industry
 An executive education/training centre
 An international business accelerator
 A research centre

Together with Télécom ParisTech (also known as ENST or Télécom Paris), Télécom Bretagne, Télécom Lille 1, Eurecom and the Mines schools, Télécom & Management SudParis is a member of the Institut Mines-Télécom consortium (ex Institut Télécom, ex GET).

In 2008, the INT was renamed Télécom & Management SudParis in line with the strategy of Institut Télécom.

Facilities
 180 faculty staff
 140 PhD students
 11 teaching and research departments:
 Teaching and research departments:
 Language and Human Science
 Entrepreneurship, Management, Marketing and Strategy
 Economics, Finance and Sociology
 Information Systems
 Advanced Research and Techniques for Multidimensional Imaging Systems (ARTEMIS)
 Communications, Images and Information Analysis
 Electronics and Physics
 Computer science
 Networks and Software
 Networks and Multimedia mobile services
 Telecommunications Networks

References

External links
 Télécom SudParis (ex Télécom INT)
 Institut Mines-Télécom Business School (ex Télécom École de Management, ex INT Management)
 Institut Mines-Télécom
 Alumni website

Institut National des Telecommunications
Educational institutions established in 1979
Buildings and structures in Évry, Essonne
Universities in Île-de-France
1979 establishments in France
Education in Évry, Essonne
Telecommunication education